The transport system of Kolkata, a city in India, is a mix of modern mass rapid transport and old transport modalities like rickshaws. Kolkata is connected to the rest of India by the National Highways, the extensive network of the Indian Railways, National Waterways and by air. The most traffic to Northeast India route via Kolkata.

Roads

Howrah Bridge (also known as Rabindra Setu) and Vidyasagar Setu (also known as Second Hooghly Bridge) are two bridges connecting Kolkata with Howrah over the Ganges. Bally Bridge (also known as Vivekandanda Setu) is the third bridge over the river at the northern reach of the city near Dakshineswar from Howrah.It is a road cum rail bridge. The fourth and the newest one is Nivedita Setu which is a toll bridge beside Vivekananda Setu.

Since Kolkata suffers from traffic congestion like other Indian cities, a network of expressways like Kona Expressway, Kalyani Expressway, Belghoria Expressway, flyovers and widening of southern stretch of Eastern Metropolitan Bypass are being created to ease up road traffic. Maa Flyover is an important flyover in Kolkata.

A Large network of roads are spread over in Kolkata which helps to reduce traffic congestion. Elevated roads are present in New Town and Rajarhat area of Kolkata. Kolkata is connected to other parts of India by the National Highways 2, 6, 34, and 117. The Belghoria Expressway connects NH 34 with NH 2 and 6 via the Nivedita Setu while the NH 117 is connected to NH 6 by the Kona Expressway via the Vidyasagar Setu.

Railways

Kolkata is well-connected to the rest of India by an extensive railway network of the Indian railways. Two divisions of the Indian railways - the Eastern Railway and the South Eastern Railway - are headquartered in the city. A total of five railway stations serve Kolkata. The two major railway stations of the city are at Howrah and Sealdah. The third station is called Kolkata has recently been constructed. This station is in North Kolkata and can be reached by a road opposite to the Radha Gobinda Kar Medical College & Hospital just beyond Shyambazar. International trains such as Maitree Express and Bandhan Express depart from Kolkata Station. The fourth station is Santragachi Junction which operates weekly and bi-weekly express trains to ease pressure on Howrah junction. The fifth station is named Shalimar Railway Station which used to be a goods yard has been transformed into a station from where mail and express trains operate. Nowadays the Dankuni Station is been given importance and many long route trains stop at this station.

The electrified suburban rail network of the SER and the ER is extensive and stretches far into the neighboring districts of North 24 Parganas, South 24 Parganas, Howrah, Hooghly, Nadia, East Medinipur, West Medinipur and parts of East Barddhaman. The Kolkata Suburban Railway is the largest suburban railway system in India with 1501 km route length.

The Circular Rail encircles the entire city of Kolkata, starting and terminating at Dum Dum Junction. However, the poorly-patronized branch line between Dum Dum Cantonment railway station and Biman Bandar railway station is now replaced by Line 4 (under construction) of the Kolkata Metro.

Metro Railway
 
Kolkata was the first city in South Asia to have an underground railway system that started operating in 1984. Kolkata Metro is jointly owned by Metro Railway, Kolkata and Kolkata Metro Rail Corporation.

Kolkata Metro Line 1 (Blue Line) is under the administration of Metro Railway, Kolkata. It has the status of a Zonal Railway and is directly run by the Indian Railways. Kolkata Metro Line 1 is the oldest operating metro system in India which started operation in 1984. This metro system consists of elevated tracks as well as underground tunnels with electric current coming from a third rail. The rakes are both AC as well as Non-AC. Since October 2021, Non-AC metro services has been discontinued.

Kolkata Metro Line 2 (Green Line) is under the administration of Kolkata Metro Rail Corporation. Green Line is going to have India's first underwater metro system. It consists only AC rakes.

Lines which are operational are:

Kolkata Metro Line 1 (North-South Metro) begins at Dakshineswar in the north and continues south through Esplanade in the heart of the city until the southern end in New Garia. Blue Line is mostly underground with few portion on elevated tracks which makes it a different metro system from the rest of metro systems in India.

Kolkata Metro Line 2 (East-West Metro) begins at Bidhannagar Sector 5 in the east to Phoolbagan. Only Phase 1 is completed. The phase 1 is on elevated tracks. The Phase 2 from Phoolbagan to Howrah Maidan is under construction. The Phase 2 is mostly underground. This phase 2 of the Green Line will cross through the Hooghly River and it will be India's first underwater metro system. In July 2022, the Sealdah Metro Station was inaugurated and currently the line extends from Bidhannagar Sector 5 To Sealdah. The next portion which will be inaugurated will be from Sealdah to Howrah Maidan via Esplanade.

Other lines being constructed are:
 Kolkata Metro Line 3 (Esplanade - Behala - Joka) [Purple Line].
 Kolkata Metro Line 4 (Noapara - Airport - Barasat) [Yellow Line].
 Kolkata Metro Line 5 (Baranagar - Barrackpore) [Pink Line] (planned but construction has not started).
 Kolkata Metro Line 6 (New Garia - EM Bypass - Salt Lake - Rajarhat Newtown - Airport) [Orange Line].

Some extensions are also planned.

Trains run at a frequency of every 5 minutes (Peak Hours) to 15 minutes (Non-Peak Hours) from 6:55 a.m. to 10:30 p.m. from Monday to Saturday and from 09:50 a.m. to 10:00 p.m. on Sunday. Fares range between ₹5 to ₹30. The Kolkata Metro has commendable service, affordable ticket prices, clean stations and safety.

Buses

Kolkata despite not having any Rapid Bus Transit System has an extensive network of government run and privately run buses. Buses in Kolkata and other parts of West Bengal do not have a card system. One has to buy tickets after boarding the bus. The bus tickets are simple paper tickets purchased from the bus conductor. The government buses were previously run by Calcutta State Transport Corporation, Calcutta Tramways Company, West Bengal Surface Transport Corporation, North Bengal State Transport Corporation and South Bengal State Transport Corporation .In the year 2016, the first three government bus companies merged and formed West Bengal Transport Corporation. The government buses are generally painted either blue color with white stripes or white color with blue stripes. This buses are identified by the WBTC symbol on the front windscreen and on their body. Usually these buses are big. Both the name of the destination place as well as the name of the originating place is mentioned on the front of the bus either digitally [LED Board] or written [White Board].The fleet consist of Ashok Leyland Jan Bus, Tata Motors Marcopolo Bus and Eicher Motors Starline bus. Air-conditioned buses have been introduced in the year 2014 under Jawaharlal Nehru National Urban Renewal Mission (JNNURM) and are operated by WBTC.  Air-conditioned buses have been included to provide comfort to daily commuters to make there travel less tiresome.However AC buses are quite empty as their fares are too high for the normal commuter. The fleet consist of Tata Motors Marcopolo buses and Volvo 8400 Model buses. In the year 2019, electric AC buses were introduced. Tata Motors were given contract by Government Of West Bengal to supply 80 such buses to WBTC. Non-AC buses fare start from Rs.10 whereas AC buses fare start from Rs.25.Government buses stop only at designated bus stands.

The private buses are run by private operators who are affiliated with bus unions like Joint Council of Bus Syndicate. This bus unions are affiliated with political parties in West Bengal. The private-owned buses are of three types, the regular ones, the mini-buses and buses without any route number. The regular buses are colored blue and yellow. Short distance buses (the ones with prefix 'SD') are colored blue and white.
The mini-buses are of red and yellow and contain lesser number of seats. The mini-buses were started in the late seventies as a relief for the office commuters from the overloaded buses by being a sitting-only service. But at present both regular and mini buses are overloaded and crowded largely due to the massive population of Kolkata. The third type is private buses without any route number. This buses may be of regular type or mini type and may be of different color. The private buses are Non-AC. These buses have Route numbers and name of stoppages as well as origin and destination is mentioned on the body. Usually, the conductor will call out the names of the stops at each halt, which makes boarding the right bus easier. If in doubt, the conductor or a fellow passenger will help out. The buses will often stop to pick up a passenger who waves at the bus.

Long-distance buses operated by both government and private operators starting from Kolkata to various parts of West Bengal and other neighboring states originate from the central bus depot at Dharmatala (also known as Esplanade)  and Salt Lake Bus Stand. International bus service to Bangladesh is also available which departs from Esplanade bus stand and Barasat bus stand. The tickets can be purchased on spot from the counters or from online ticket booking websites. For  international buses however one has to change buses at the border. One bus will drive from the bus terminus to the border with India and Bangladesh. After border checking and immigration is completed and we are inside the other country, another bus with the driver and conductor of that country will take us to our destination. Which bus to board will be mentioned.

Taxis 

Taxis are a very important aspect of Kolkata. In Kolkata only four people are allowed in a taxi. The metered-cabs are mostly of the brand Ambassador. Once in a while, Tata Indigo CS can be seen painted in yellow. They are not for middle class and poor people as their rates are too high. One has to pay an addition of Rs. 30 apart from the price shown on the meter. These vintage yellow taxis are there for a long time now. They are non air conditioned. Many people use them as their main mode of transportation. From December 2013,under Gatidhara Scheme Of Government Of West Bengal, a new fleet of no-refusal taxis had started to ply. Most of these taxis are air conditioned and are in white livery with a blue strip and AC Taxi mentioned on the door and roof of the car. The fare is same as in that of yellow taxis (same rate as flashed on the meter), except if driven with ac turned on, the passenger has to pay 25% extra of the displayed fare. So if the displayed fare is Rs. 50, the rate would be Rs. 63. Radio taxis such as Mega Cabs and Blue Arrow Cabs are present. App based cab service like Ola & Uber are present. Private Operators are also available. One has to call them personally to book a ride. The private operators mainly provide cab service for long distance outstation travel. Shuttle services are also available.

Trams

Kolkata is the only city in India to have a tram network. Trams are under the administration of the Calcutta Tramways Company, a government of West Bengal Undertaking, popularly called CTC (now merged with West Bengal Transport Corporation). The environment-friendliness and the age-old charm of the trams attract some people. The tram lines, laid in some major roads, are now renovated to place the tram lines on the same level plane as the rest of the road, thereby smoothening the road. In places, the original central boulevards reserved only for the trams have been removed; the tram-lines are thus brought in the same plane as that of the road. The usable space of the road for vehicle movement has thereby considerably increased.With embedding of tram tracks in the road surface, the overall surface has become smoother, easing the traffic to some extent.With the tracks now running in the centre of the heavy traffic roads, commuters are encountering difficulties in getting to the trams' stops through the traffic and as a result, fewer people are able to use the tram. Mostly trams are found to be running with many seats vacant even during rush hours. This has also caused reduction of revenue for Calcutta Tram Company. One possible remedy towards difficulty of approach-ability to the trams could be to relay the tracks on left and the right sides of the road, adjacent to the footpaths. However, relaying the track may not be possible now as the modification will need enormous expenditure. Moreover, in many thoroughfares one flank of the road is used for parking cars on payment of fee. Thereby generating revenue to the government as well as providing space for car parking. Hence, relaying tram tracks on the side of the road may not be feasible. Though trams are environment friendly, the main drawbacks of tram are that they are slow moving and occupy a lot of road space which itself is less in Kolkata. In case of derailment or breakdown of a tram the entire road gets obstructed. It will be better to keep trams in only some roads where problem of traffic jams are expected to be less. The solution to this would be to improve the maintenance of the trams as well as the support of local traffic sergeants. Signals can be modified to stop when a tram is coming, for its easy passage. Also, tram tracks should be demarcated with a small but sturdy demarcation, which will enable bikes to traverse when there are no trams. Now, several initiatives have started to improve the tram's popularity as well as increasing revenues. The results are positive. The Tram Museum is the latest addition to such schemes, which also include heritage trams' small models and meals on wheels trams i.e. with dining options. 1st AC passenger tram ran in the city in 2019. Each of the AC trams, built at the Nonapukur tram depot near Muzaffar Ahmed Sarani, cost Rs 25 lakh and is fitted with a 5.5 tonne AC unit, LED light bulbs and fans.

Rickshaws, auto-rickshaws and e-rickshaws

Rickshaws pulled by men are common in Kolkata and West Bengal . Many migrants from Bihar and rural West Bengal are involved in rickshaw pulling. Nowadays except for some parts of Kolkata all the hand pulled rickshaws have been replaced by cycle rickshaws. Fares are usually set by the rickshaw unions. These rickshaws usually operate over short distances due to the manual effort involved, and mainly run on narrow lanes where buses and auto-rickshaws don't ply. These rickshaws are not allowed to ply over main roads of Kolkata. Hand pulled rickshaws are mainly found in some old localities of North Kolkata and South Kolkata. Moreover, cycle rickshaws are also now being replaced by E-Rickshaw. They also ply on narrow lanes and not allowed to ply over main roads.

Auto-rickshaws have become a very common mode of transport for short distances. They are usually not metered, and are usually shared. There are several routes, and the auto-rickshaws of a particular route ply between two distinct places of that route only. Colloquially called autos, they usually accommodate three people in the backseat, and one passenger in front beside the driver. The fares are usually quite low compared to other metro cities like Delhi and Mumbai, the minimum fare being Rs10. Unlike other metros, the auto rickshaws do not run on a fare meter. The auto rickshaws are not allowed in major arterial roads and certain part of the city.

Many suburban parts of Kolkata have e-rickshaws running on battery. The minimum fare is Rs.10. Colloquially called "totos", they usually accommodate around 4 people with 2 opposite facing seats. Totos are very popular mode of transport in suburban parts of Kolkata and rural West Bengal. They are considered new and cleaner mode of public transport as they run on electricity.

Airport

The Netaji Subhash Chandra Bose International Airport (also known as Kolkata Airport/Dum Dum Airport) at Dum Dum  is the only airport in Kolkata Metropolitan Area, operating both domestic and international flights. It is an important airport connecting Kolkata to different cities of India and neighboring countries of Nepal, Bhutan and Bangladesh. Kolkata Airport ranks fifth in the list of the busiest airports in India. The number of people using the airport has consistently increased over the last few years. There is a flying club in Behala. After several years of inactivity, it has been restored. It is the oldest flying institute on the country.

Seaport

Kolkata is a major riverine port and together with Haldia deep water port, the Syama Prasad Mookerjee Port Trust (formerly Kolkata Port Trust) has been ranked 6th in India. The port  has regular passenger services to Port Blair.Ferry services between Kolkata - Howrah and Kolkata - Sagar Island are available. This ferry services are provided from various ghats like Fairlie Ghat, Howrah Ghat, Shibpur Ghat, Prinsep Ghat, Babughat and Cossipore Ghat.

References

External links

 Metro Railway, Kolkata
 Kolkata Metro Rail Corporation
 Eastern Railway
 South Eastern Railway
 West Bengal Transport Corporation
 Calcutta Tramways Company

 
Kolkata